A World Without Thieves  is a 2004 Chinese action drama film directed by Feng Xiaogang and starring Andy Lau, Rene Liu, Ge You, Wang Baoqiang and Li Bingbing. The film is an adaptation of a 1999 novelette of the same title by Zhao Benfu. The original story is moderately different from the film adaptation. The film was first released in Shanghai, China on 5 December 2004. It clinched the 2005 Golden Horse Award for Best Screenplay Adaptation.

The film was released in Hong Kong with Cantonese dubbing provided by Lau for his own role, Anthony Wong for the role of Uncle Li, and Chapman To for the role of Sha Gen.

The plot is centered on a naïve village boy who does not believe in the existence of thieves. Returning home on board a train with his savings, he soon becomes the target of many thieves. The film explores the theme of the fundamental human goodness and also addresses humorously the issue of rampant thievery on public transport in Mainland China.

Plot
The story is set primarily on a train bound inland from Tibet. Sha Gen ("Dumbo" in the U.S. version, played by Wang Baoqiang), a naïve village boy working as construction worker in Tibet, was returning home to get married. Refusing to believe that thieves exist in the world, Sha Gen insists on carrying his five years of savings worth ¥60,000 ($8,400 USD) with him rather than use remittance. Sha Gen also brazenly shouts his earnings in a crowded street. As such, he has attracted the attention of Wang Bo (Andy Lau) and Wang Li (Rene Liu), who are lovers as well as highly skilled professional thieves. Wang Bo wants to steal the money as a last hit to end their career, but Wang Li, pregnant with their child and moved by Sha Gen's innocence, decides to protect the boy.

The situation is further complicated when a small gang of thieves led by Hu Li (homophone of fox (狐狸 Húli) in Chinese), also known as Uncle Li (Ge You), boards the train. Uncle Li instructs his followers, among them Xiao Ye (Li Bingbing) and Four-Eyes (Gordon Lam), to refrain from doing a job on the train. Tempted by the huge amount of cash, however, some members disobey and strike, only to be robbed by Wang Bo moments later. This exposes Wang's skills to Uncle Li, who becomes highly interested in recruiting him. When Wang declines, the contest between the Wangs and Uncle Li's gang quickly escalates, with Sha Gen still completely unaware of the danger surrounding him.

While the two sides tussle, however, a plainclothes police detective (Zhang Hanyu) has been silently watching and awaiting his chance. As the police force eventually closes in, Uncle Li attempts to make off with Sha Gen's money but is confronted by Wang Bo, who has finally promised to lend his help to Wang Li to protect Sha Gen's innocence. The two engage in a violent hand-to-hand combat. Although Wang succeeds in retrieving the money and giving it back, he is seriously injured in the fray, and subsequently dies. Uncle Li and his gang are all apprehended as the train pulls into station, but the police officer lets Wang Li go on compassionate grounds. Wang Li returns to Tibet sometime later, and prays to the heavens in a show of penance.

Cast
 Andy Lau as Wang Bo (C: 王 薄, P: Wáng Bó)
 Rene Liu as Wang Li (S: 王 丽, T: 王 麗, P: Wáng Lì)
 Ge You as Hu Li, a.k.a. Uncle Li (C: 黎叔, P: Lí-shū),
 Li Bingbing as Xiao Ye (S: 小叶, T: 小葉, P: Xiǎo Yè, "Little Ye")
 Wang Baoqiang as Sha Gen (C: 傻根, P: Shǎ Gēn, "Foolish Root," "Dumbo" in the U.S. version)
 You Yong as Thief Number Two (S: 二当家, T: 二當家, P: Èr Dāngjiā) or "Fatty", follower of Uncle Li
 Gordon Lam as Four-Eyes (C: 四眼, P: Sìyǎn)
 Zhang Hanyu as police detective (C: 警察 Jǐngchá)
 Fu Biao as General Manager Liu (S: 刘经理, P: 劉經理, P: Liú-jīnglǐ), a previous victim of the Wangs
 Xu Fan as General Manager Liu's wife
 Fan Wei as fat robber
 Feng Yuanzheng as thin robber
 Zhong Ping as plain-clothes policewoman
 Chen Zhihui

Reception
The film recorded ¥100,000 in box office earnings on its premier night in Beijing. Within ten days of release the total box office earnings in Mainland China exceeded ¥80 million. This figure rose to ¥100 million on the last day of 2004. This, together with a comparable box office achievement by the Stephen Chow production Kung Fu Hustle, released within the same month, has been hailed as a new milestone for the Chinese film industry. However, the film did not do as well in the Hong Kong market.

Almost two months after the film's release, China Post voiced dissatisfaction over the film's misguiding information on the administrative charges for remitting money through China Post. In a scene, Sha Gen claimed that remitting ¥60,000 requires an administrative charge of ¥600. China Post verified that it would only require ¥100 and said it would not rule out seeking damages.

Awards and nominations
 Golden Horse Awards, 2005
 Best Screenplay Adaptation – Feng Xiaogang, Wang Gang, Lin Lisheng, Zhang Jialu
 Best Picture (nominated)
 Best Action Choreography (nominated)
 Best Editing (nominated)
 24th Hong Kong Film Awards, 2005
 Best Asian Film (nominated)
 Golden Bauhinia Awards, 2005
 Best Leading Actress – Rene Liu
 Top Ten Chinese Films
 Montréal World Film Festival, 2005
 Grand Prix des Amériques (nominated)
 Hundred Flowers Awards, 2006
 Best Leading Actress – Rene Liu

References

External links

 
 
 

2004 films
2004 action films
2004 martial arts films
2000s crime films
Chinese action films
Chinese crime drama films
Chinese martial arts films
Hong Kong action films
Hong Kong martial arts films
Films based on short fiction
2000s Mandarin-language films
Media Asia films
Films directed by Feng Xiaogang
Films set on trains
Films with screenplays by Zhang Jialu
Huayi Brothers films
Films shot in Beijing
Films shot in Gansu
Films based on Chinese novels
2000s Hong Kong films